Enrico Rossi (born 27 June 1993) is an Italian beach volleyball player. He competed in the 2020 Summer Olympics.

References

External links
 
 
 
 

1993 births
Living people
People from Cesenatico
Beach volleyball players at the 2020 Summer Olympics
Italian beach volleyball players
Olympic beach volleyball players of Italy
European Games competitors for Italy
Beach volleyball players at the 2015 European Games
Sportspeople from the Province of Forlì-Cesena